Paddy O'Brien (born 1979) is an Irish hurler who played as a left corner-forward for the Tipperary senior team.

O'Brien joined the team during the 2000 championship and was a member of the team until he left the panel after the 2006 championship. An All-Ireland medalist in the minor grade, he later won a senior All-Ireland winners' medal on the field of play.

At club level O'Brien is a two-time Munster medalist with Toomevara. In addition to this he has also won eight county club championship medals.

References

1979 births
Living people
Toomevara hurlers
Tipperary inter-county hurlers
Munster inter-provincial hurlers
All-Ireland Senior Hurling Championship winners